Shura is a method of decision-making in Islamic cultures. In Russia Shura is one of the diminutives of Alexander or Alexandra.
Shura may also refer to:

Legislative bodies
Majlis-ash-Shura, type of Shura Council in government
Shura Council, former name of the Senate (Egypt)
Leadership Council of Afghanistan
Consultative Assembly of Saudi Arabia
Consultative Assembly of Qatar
Consultative Assembly (Oman)
Consultative Council (Bahrain)
Islamic Consultative Assembly
Shura Council, the upper house of the Parliament of Yemen
Parliament of Pakistan

People
Shura Tegleva (1894–1955), Russian nursemaid who served in the Imperial Household
Shura Cherkassky (1911–1995), American classical pianist
Shura Taft (born 1982), English-born Australian television and radio presenter
Mary Francis Shura (1923–1991), American writer
Shura (English singer) (born 1988)
Shura (Russian singer) (born 1975)
Shura Baryshnikov (born 1981), American dancer

Religion
Ash-Shura, the 42nd sura of the Qur'an
Shura, an alternate Japanese term referring to one of the six realms of reincarnation; the kanji are also used in the name for the Buddhist entities known otherwise as Asura

Arts and entertainment
Shura mono, a theme in Noh, a major form of classical Japanese musical drama
Shura, a character in the Soul series of fighting games
Capricorn Shura, a character from the Japanese manga Saint Seiya

Other
Shura (rural locality), several rural localities in Russia
Shura, a Tatar journal published between 1908–1918 in the Russian Empire